Ghost Ship is an original novella written by Keith Topping and based on the long-running British science fiction television series Doctor Who. It features the Fourth Doctor. It was released both as a standard edition hardback and a deluxe edition featuring a frontispiece by Dariusz Jasiczak, and a paperback edition. Both editions have a foreword by Hugh Lamb.

Plot
An ocean cruise just might be the thing to draw the Doctor out of his dark mood. Except dangerous forces are attracted to him onboard. Which is one thing, but they threaten the lives of the passengers as well.

External links
The Cloister Library - Ghost Ship

2002 British novels
2002 science fiction novels
Doctor Who novellas
Fourth Doctor novels
British science fiction novels
Novels by Keith Topping
Telos Publishing books